Bill or William Ford may refer to:

Business and industry
William Clay Ford Sr. (1925–2014), youngest of the four children of Edsel Ford and a grandchild of Henry Ford
William Clay Ford Jr. (born 1957), great-grandson of Henry Ford and Executive Chairman of Ford Motor Company
William E. Ford (born 1961), American businessman

Politics
William Donnison Ford (1779–1833), U.S. Representative from New York
William D. Ford (1927–2004), U.S. Representative from Michigan
Guillermo Ford (1939–2011), known as Billy, vice president of Panama
William Ford (MP), Member of Parliament (MP) for Melcombe Regis

Sports
William Augustus Ford (1818–1873), English cricketer
William Ford (jockey), British steeplechase rider in 1848 Grand National
Bill Ford (outfielder) (1880–1962), American Negro league baseball player
Bill Ford (footballer) (1906–1984), Australian footballer for Richmond and Hawthorn
Bill Ford (pitcher) (1915–1994), American Major League Baseball pitcher

Others
William Ford (divine) (1559–1616 or after), Church of England clergyman
William Prince Ford (1803–1866), preacher and farmer in pre – Civil War Louisiana
William Ford (prospector) (1852–1932), discovered gold in Australia, 1892
William Justice Ford (1853–1904), English schoolmaster, known as a cricketer and sports writer
William P. Ford (1936–2008), advocate for the people of El Salvador
Willie Ford (died 2019), American musician, member of The Dramatics